Ivy Grace Fife (1903–1976), born Ivy Grace Hofmeister, was a New Zealand painter based in Christchurch and Canterbury. Known for her portraits, her work also includes landscapes and is reflective of life in Canterbury and the South Island of New Zealand.

Working in gouache, oils, watercolours, ink and wash, and pencil, she was influenced by W.A. Sutton and a contemporary of Olivia Spencer Bower and Russell Clark.

Education 
Fife's early education included Elmwood School and Christchurch Girls' High School. In 1920, Fife enrolled in the Canterbury College School of Fine Art and after graduation continued her association with the school, including as Lecturer in Design, until her retirement in 1959. While at the school she worked with Cecil Kelly, Archibald Nicholl, F. A. Shurrock, Richard Wallwork and Leonard Booth.

Exhibitions 
Fife's work has been included in several art society exhibitions at Christchurch, Dunedin, Invercargill and Nelson, as well as the Gallery of the New Zealand Academy in Wellington. In 1958, five of her paintings were included in an exhibition by the Auckland City Art Gallery entitled Eight New Zealand Painters, exhibiting alongside W. A. Sutton, Milan Mrkusich, Rita Angus, Clifford Murray, Michael Nicholson, Sydney Thompson, and Dennis Knight Turner. The exhibition toured cities and towns throughout the country and provided public exposure to the New Zealand painters involved. Fife has been part of several exhibitions at the Christchurch Art Gallery Te Puna o Waiwhetu including: One Hundred New Zealand Painters (1965); A Harbour View (1989); About Town (1995); 40 out of 40: Canterbury Painters 1958–1998 (1997–98). Although she never had a solo show while alive, in 1997 the McDougall Art Gallery (now Christchurch Art Gallery Te Puna o Waiwhetu) hosted an exhibition of her work entitled Ivy Fife Retrospective 1938–1976.

Positions held 
Ivy Fife was a member and Council Member of the Canterbury Society of Arts from 1949 to 1966, and a member of the Advisory Committee of the Robert McDougall Art Gallery.

References

Further reading 
Artist files for Ivy Fife are held at:
 Angela Morton Collection, Takapuna Library
 E. H. McCormick Research Library, Auckland Art Gallery Toi o Tāmaki
 Robert and Barbara Stewart Library and Archives, Christchurch Art Gallery Te Puna o Waiwhetu
 Hocken Collections Uare Taoka o Hākena
 Te Aka Matua Research Library, Museum of New Zealand Te Papa Tongarewa

Also see:
 Concise Dictionary of New Zealand Artists, McGahey, Kate (2000) Gilt Edge
 Ivy Fife Retrospective

1903 births
1976 deaths
20th-century New Zealand women artists
New Zealand painters
New Zealand women painters
University of Canterbury alumni
Ilam School of Fine Arts alumni
People educated at Christchurch Girls' High School
People associated with the Museum of New Zealand Te Papa Tongarewa
People associated with the Canterbury Society of Arts
Academic staff of the University of Canterbury